Qalet Marku Redoubt was a redoubt in the limits of Naxxar, Malta. It was built in 1715–1716 by the Order of Saint John as one of a series of coastal fortifications around the Maltese Islands. It was demolished to make way for the coast road, but its remains are possibly still buried under the road.

History
Qalet Marku Redoubt was built in 1715–1716 as part of the first building programme of redoubts in Malta. The nearest fortifications to the redoubt were Għallis Battery to the northwest and Qalet Marku Battery to the east. Both of these batteries are now largely destroyed, but some remains still survive.

The redoubt originally consisted of a pentagonal platform with a low parapet. A rectangular blockhouse was located at the centre of its gorge.

The redoubt was demolished to make way for the Baħar iċ-Ċagħaq–Salina coast road. Its remains are probably still buried under the surface of the road. Part of the structure can still be seen protruding from beneath the road, although it is encased in concrete.

References

External links

National Inventory of the Cultural Property of the Maltese Islands

Redoubts in Malta
Hospitaller fortifications in Malta
Military installations established in 1715
Buildings and structures demolished in the 20th century
Demolished buildings and structures in Malta
Naxxar
Limestone buildings in Malta
National Inventory of the Cultural Property of the Maltese Islands
18th-century fortifications
1715 establishments in Malta
18th Century military history of Malta